Miguel Estanislao Soler (May 7, 1783 – September 23, 1849) was an Argentine general, who fought in the Argentine War of Independence. He was appointed governor of the Banda Oriental by Buenos Aires in 1814, but he was resisted by Artigas and left the city in 1815. He was one of the three generals of the Crossing of the Andes, along with José de San Martín and Bernardo O'Higgins. He also fought in the battle of Ituzaingó, against Brazil.

Further reading 

Argentine generals
People of the Argentine War of Independence
People of the Cisplatine War
Federales (Argentina)
1783 births
1849 deaths
Burials at La Recoleta Cemetery